Katolophyromai, is the headword in a musical fragment from the first stasimon of Orestes by Euripides (lines 338-344, Vienna Papyrus G 2315). It means "I cry, lament so much." In 1892, among a number of papyri from Hermopolis, Egypt, in the collection of Archduke Rainer Ferdinand of Austria, a fragment was discovered and published by the papyrologist Karl Wessely, containing a mutilated passage with musical notation. Although Vienna Papyrus G 2315 dates to the third century B.C., the melody recorded on it may have been written much earlier.

Text
The full text of the musical fragment reads as follows:

Unlike other fragments, however, the text and musical notations are quite well preserved.

Poetic features
The metre of the song is mainly dochmiac. The preserved vocal notes coincide with the ancient Dorian or Phrygian harmoniai transmitted by Aristides Quintilianus, the Damonian harmoniai, in enharmonic genus, which was usual in tragedy of fifth century BC.

Authorship
Whether this fragment represents the original music Euripides composed in 408 BC is an open question, given the absence of 5th century BC musical inscriptions. The fragment accords with observations by Dionysius of Halicarnassus and Aristophanes about the complexity of Euripidean style.

See also
Euripides, Orestes 338-44 (Pap. Vienna G 2315)

References

Further reading 
Apollo’s lyre: Greek music and music theory in antiquity and the Middle Ages By Thomas J. Mathiesen  Pages 116-124  (1999)
The Orestes of Euripides Excursus B, the Musical Fragment, Pages 203-204 Cambridge University Press (1928).

External links

 Performance by Daemonia Nymphe, by Petros Tabouris
 Translation of the fragment by Dr. Norman Prinsky
 The whole stasimon, lines 316 – 347 in English and Greek from Perseus Project

Ancient Greek music
Ancient Greek laments
Ancient Greek theatre